The United States Senate Committee on Coast and Insular Survey was created in 1899 and terminated in 1921.

Chairmen
Addison G. Foster (R-WA) 1899-1903
Levi Ankeny (R-WA) 1903-1905
Samuel Piles (R-WA) 1905-1911
Charles E. Townsend (R-MI) 1911-1913
Willard Saulsbury, Jr. (D-DE) 1913-1918
Edward J. Gay (D-LA) 1918-1919
Walter Edge (R-NJ) 1919-1921

Coast and Insular Survey
1899 establishments in the United States
1921 disestablishments in Washington, D.C.